HPI may refer to:

Organisations
 HPI Ltd, a British company that provides vehicle history checks and car valuations
 HPI Groupe, a French company specialized in radio broadcasting
 HPI, LLC, an American company specialized in industrial turbo-machinery
 Huaneng Power International, a Chinese power company
 Huron Potawatomi, Inc., the business division of the Nottawaseppi Huron Band of Potawatomi
 Heinrich Pette Institute, an institute for basic research in virology and immunology, based in Hamburg, Germany
 Hasso Plattner Institute, an information technology university college in Potsdam, Germany
 HP Inc., an American technology company

Medicine
 Human probiotic infusion, a treatment, targeting the intestines
 High probability instruction, a behaviorist therapy based on positive reinforcement
 History of the present illness, a detailed interview prompted by the chief complaint or presenting symptom

Economics
 House price index, a measure of property value
 Human Poverty Index, a United Nations measure of the amount of poverty in various countries

Other uses
 Human performance improvement, a field of study related to process improvement methodologies 
 Happy Planet Index, an index of human well-being and environmental impact
 Hardware Platform Interface, a technical specification defined by the Service Availability Forum
 Henley Passport Index, a measure of how easy travel is for citizens of a country

 HPI (TV series), a 2021 French television series.

hpi may refer to:

 hours post infection